Edmund "Leo" Morrissey (1914-1965) was an Australian politician. He was a member of the Labor Party (ALP) for the seat of Mernda from December 1952 until April 1955. In 1955, he left the ALP and "crossed the floor" and joined the anti-Communist Democratic Labor Party.

He died on 22 August 1965 at the age of 51 in Diamond Creek.

References

1914 births
1965 deaths
Victoria (Australia) state politicians
Australian Labor Party members of the Parliament of Victoria
Democratic Labor Party (historical) members of the Parliament of Victoria
Members of the Victorian Legislative Assembly
20th-century Australian politicians